Pioneer is the name of the first railroad locomotive to operate in Chicago, Illinois.  It was built in 1837 by Baldwin Locomotive Works for the Utica and Schenectady Railroad (U&S) in New York, then purchased used by William B. Ogden for the Galena and Chicago Union Railroad (G&CU, the oldest predecessor of Chicago and North Western Railway). The locomotive arrived in Chicago by schooner on October 10, 1848, and it pulled the first train westbound out of the city on October 25, 1848.

History 

When the locomotive was built by Baldwin #184 in 1837 for the U&S which gave it the name Alert.  It worked almost a decade before it was sold in 1848 to the Galena and Chicago Union Railroad.  The G&CU renamed the locomotive Pioneer and used it in the construction of the G&CU until 1850, at which time the locomotive was loaned to the Chicago, Burlington and Quincy Railroad for work laying the first track in Chicago that summer. The Pioneer was returned and became its road work locomotive. After the G&CU was merged into the Chicago and North Western (C&NW), the locomotive remained in service, until it was retired in 1875 at West Chicago, IL 

The locomotive has been preserved and is on display at the Chicago History Museum.

References 

 Chicago Historical Society, History Lab Collections - Riding the Rails.  Retrieved October 25, 2005.
 Rivanna Chapter, National Railway Historical Society (2005), This Month in Railroad History - October. Retrieved October 25, 2005.
 SteamLocomotive.com (November 1, 2004), Chicago Area Steam.  Retrieved October 25, 2005.
  History Channel, Deep Sea Detectives. Retrieved July 3, 2008.

Individual locomotives of the United States
4-2-0 locomotives
Chicago and North Western Railway locomotives
Early steam locomotives
History of Chicago
Preserved steam locomotives of Illinois